Furna de Água is a cave system located in the municipality of Angra do Heroísmo, on the island of Terceira in the Portuguese archipelago of the Azores. Although known since 1838 (and perhaps earlier), Furna de Água only began to be prospected and used in the mid-20th century.

History
Its name originated from the existence of an abundance of springs in its interior, many of which became known since 1838. At that time, the famed Terceirense historian Francisco Ferreira Drummond was local representative in Vila de São Sebastião, and he investigated the stories about the Furna do Cabrito and Furna d'Água in order to provide fresh potable water to the region. At that time, it was decided that Furna do Cabrito would be a source of water, but not the Furna d'Água, since it would be difficult to capture the waters of this spring.

In 1867, Frank Fouqué, on a visit to Terceira to study the submarine eruptions on Serreta, wrote of a lava tunnel at the entrance to the Guilherme Moniz caldera, referring to it as one of the more beautiful that he had visited. From his description, it is likely that he was referring to Furna d'Água.

The municipal council of Angra do Heroîsmo, considered the possibility of tapping the waters of the Furna de Água in 1945, but this project never advanced.

It was only on 1 September 1953, under the initiative of the General Junta, that the first public works to capture the spring water of Furna d'Água were initiated, along with improvements to the collection of waters from the spring at Furna do Cabrito. Waters from the site, not only supported public consumption, but were used to feed the hydroelectric generating points at Nasce Água, São João de Deus and the Duke of Terceira Garden (and even today function when necessary). It is the municipal service department of Angra do Heroísmo which continues to maintain and explore both caves, and the water used primarily to support public consumption. These two caves represent the largest sources of freshwater on the island of Terceira.

Geography
Furna d'Água is situada on the western edge of the Guilherme Moniz caldera, between Pico Espigão Barreiro and Pico da Cruz, and runs under the roadway that connects the regional Via Rápida Angra-Cabo da Praia to Cabrito.

There are three branches to the system.

The cave formed from lava that flowed from the Guilherme Moniz caldera in the direction of the area around Feteira. It is estimated that this occurred approximately 2000 years ago. The hollow tube developed from the receding of magma and the strangulation of lava flow, corresponding to an area at the beginning of the cave, which separated this cave from Gruta dos Ratos. Even following public works to make the site suitable for visitors, there are several observable signs of lava flows, estalacites debris, lava do tipo "pão de milho" (in the last chamber) and lava aa (in the central floor of the cave). During the course of preparing the site, parts of the cave were destroyed with explosives, resulting in the destruction of lateral walls, ceiling and original floor, to allow the transport of water from its interior.

References
Notes

Sources
 
 

Angra do Heroísmo
Caves of the Azores
Volcanoes of Portugal
Lava tubes